Sybra subfasciata is a species of beetle in the family Cerambycidae. It was described by Henry Walter Bates in 1884.

Subspecies
 Sybra subfasciata mikuraensis (Hayashi, 1969)
 Sybra subfasciata subfasciata (Bates, 1884)
 Sybra subfasciata trimeresura Takakuwa, 1984

References

subfasciata
Beetles described in 1884